Pablo Lechuga Rodriguez (born 16 August 1990 in Jaén) is a Spanish racing cyclist.

Palmarès
2014
1st Stage 1 Tour de Gironde (TTT)

References

1990 births
Living people
Spanish male cyclists
Sportspeople from the Province of Jaén (Spain)
Cyclists from Andalusia